Praeteropus monachus is a species of skink found in Queensland in Australia.

References

Praeteropus
Reptiles described in 2021
Taxa named by Mark Norman Hutchinson
Taxa named by Patrick J. Couper
Taxa named by Andrew P. Amey